Richard Davis may refer to:

Business
 Rich Davis (1926–2015), American businessman, creator of KC Masterpiece barbecue sauce
 Richard K. Davis (born 1958), American businessman, chairman, president and CEO of U.S. Bancorp
 Richard C. Davis (born 1963),  American businessman, founder, president and CEO of Trademark Properties, creator of Flip This House
 Todd Davis (businessman) (Richard Todd Davis, born 1968), American businessman, founder of LifeLock
 Richard Davis, American businessman and inventor of all-kevlar body armor, founder of the Second Chance Body Armor Company

Music
 Richard Davis (composer) (died 1688), English composer and organist
 Richard Davis (bassist) (born 1930), American jazz double bass player
 Richard Davis (techno artist) (born 1952), American techno music pioneer with the group Cybotron
 Richie Davis (musician) (born 1957), American R&B guitarist and bandleader
 Richard F. W. Davis (born 1966), American musician, record producer and songwriter, pop and rock

Politics
 Richard D. Davis (1799–1871), U.S. Representative from New York
 Rick Davis (political consultant) (born 1959), American political consultant, head of the John McCain presidential campaign

Sports
 Richard Davis (footballer) (born 1943), English footballer with Plymouth Argyle, Southampton and Bristol City
 Richie Davis (born 1945), American player of American and Canadian football
 Rick Davis (born 1958), American soccer player
 Richard Davis (cricketer) (1966–2003), English cricketer
 Ricky Davis (born 1979), American basketball player

Other
 Richard Barrett Davis (1782–1854), British animal and landscape painter
 Richard Harding Davis (1864–1916), American journalist and fiction writer
 Richard Davis, friend of Elvis Presley featured in Elvis: That's the Way It Is
 Richard Davis (astronomer) (1949–2016), British astronomer
 Richard Gary Davis (fl. 1967), American soldier and recipient of the Soldier's Medal
 Richard Allen Davis (born 1954), American convicted murderer and child molester
 Richard Davis (political scientist), American political scientist, professor emeritus at Brigham Young University
 Richard L. Davis, American convicted rapist, connected to the Kennedy v. Louisiana Supreme Court decision
 Richard T. Davis (1978–2003), American soldier killed by his fellow soldiers

See also
Richard Davies (disambiguation)
Dick Davis (disambiguation)
Dickie Davis (disambiguation)